Kinley may refer to:

Kinley (brand), owned by the Coca-Cola Company
Kinley, Saskatchewan, a village in Canada
Kinley (name)